Madanapalle is the largest city in Annamayya district and Rajampet Lok Sabha constituency of the Indian state of Andhra Pradesh. It is a Selection Grade Municipal City Council and located in Madanapalle mandal, it is Madanapalle revenue division in PKM Urban Development Authority.

History 

Madanapalle was founded by Sri Maadanna in 1618 AD.

Sir Thomas Munro was first collector of Cuddapah. He constructed a small thatched house at the present Collector's bungalow and visited Madanapalle every summer. Madanapalle (Telugu:మదనపల్లె) or Madanapalle mandal (Mandal code-35), is a mandal HQ, town and a Municipality in Annamayya district of Andhra Pradesh state, India.Legend has it that the name of the town was originally " Maryaada raamanna puram" which has over time, changed into " Madanapalle". In 1850, Madanapalle was developed as subdivision and F.B. Manoly was the first Sub Collector. The town experienced several natural calamities like floods, famines and epidemics.

Rabindranath Tagore translated "Jana Gana Mana" from Bengali to English and also set it to western musical notations in Madanapalle.  The notes were provided by Tagore himself. The National Anthem was written by Rabindranath Tagore as early as in 1911 and was sung at the annual session of the Indian National Congress at Calcutta on 27 December that year.

Geography 

There are 21 villages in this mandal:
Chinnathippasamudram (CTM)
Kasiraopeta
Kothavaripalle
Pothapolu
Venkappakota
Bandameeda kammapalle
Kollabylu
Ponnetipalem
Chippili
Pappireddipalle
Kammapalle
Basinikonda
Pamaiahgaripalle
Molakaladinne
Valasapalle
Madanapalle (rural)
Ankisettipalle
Vem palle
Malepadu
Penchupadu
Theneegalavaripalle

Source : Climate

Usually summer lasts from March to June, with the advent of rainy season in June, followed by winter which lasts till the end of February.

Demographics

The total
population constitute,  males,  females and
 children, in the age group of 0–6 years. The average literacy rate stands at
81.40% with  literates, significantly higher than the national average of 73.00%.

Governance

Civic administration

There are 35 election wards represented by a councilor. Its constituents include the municipality of Madanapalle, the out growths of Ankisettipalle, Chippili, Pamaiahgaripalle, Papireddipalle, Venkappakota, partial out growths of Basinikonda, Kollabylu, Ponnetipalem and Madanapalle (rural).

Politics
Madanapalle is an Assembly constituency in Andhra Pradesh and the constituency number is 164 in Rajampet Lok Sabha constituency.

Economy 

The economy is based on agriculture and main products include tomato, mango, groundnut, tamarind and silk saris.
Madanapalle is famous for agricultural products such as tomato, mango, groundnut, tamarind etc., Madanapalle is the biggest tomato market in Asia.  The tomatoes from here are supplied to the most of the southern states & some of the northern states of India.

It is also famous for silk and silk products like saris and other casuals. The quality of silk product is recognizable. You can purchase silk sarees here at production cost. These are supplied to all major cities in South India including Bangalore, Chennai and all silk product towns for sales. Madanapalle surroundings have enormous reserves of granite.

Transport 
Madanapalle is very well connected by road and rail. There are three Bus terminals in Madanapalle. State owned APSRTC buses run to different parts of the district, state and interstate – Bengaluru (KA), Kolar (KA), Chintamani (KA) and Chennai (TN), Vellore (TN).

Madanapalle Road Railway Station (MPL) is situated on Dharmavarm - Pakala Branch line and all trains stop here.
Trains are available here to travel to Guntakal, Tirupati, Vijayawada. Daily trains are available from and to Guntakal & Tirupati. Other nearest Railway Station is Kurabalakota Railway Station where only Passenger trains stop.New Kadapa to Kolar via Madanapalle Railway line is under construction it Kadapa–Bangalore section.In this project planned to Upgrade Madanapalle Road Railway station as Junction and one New Railway station to Madanapalle Town.

Three National Highways and One Major State Highway passes through Madanapalle.

NH 71 - Madanapalle to Naidupeta Via Pileru

NH 42 - Uravakonda to Krishnagiri Via Kuppam

NH 340 - Kadapa to Bangalore.

Education
The primary and secondary school education is imparted by government, aided and private schools, under the School Education Department of the state. The medium of instruction followed by different schools are English and Telugu.

Madanapalle has long standing educational institutions like Besant Theosophical College,founded by Dr.Annie Besant in 1915.First Degree college in Rayalaseema Region and Rabindranath Tagore translated Jana Gana Mana from Bengali to English,Outside of Calcutta, the song was first sung by the bard himself at a session in Besant Theosophical College in Madanapalle, Andhra Pradesh on 28 February 1919 when Tagore visited the college and sung the song. The song enthralled the college students while Margaret Cousins, then vice-principal of the college (also an expert in European music and wife of Irish poet James Cousins), both requested Tagore to create an English translation of the song and set down the musical notation to the national anthem which were provided by Tagore himself.

Rishi Valley School, a boarding school, founded by the philosopher Jiddu Krishnamurti,
 Under Management of Krishnamurthy Foundation of India

Zilla Parishad High School, which was founded in 1924, Vasishta School (ICSE, AP State Syllabus) which was founded in 1981.

It also has five engineering colleges:
Madanapalle Institute of Technology and Science
Sir Vishveshwaraiah Institute of Science & Technology
Aditya College of Engineering
Golden Valley Integrated Campus
Viswam Group of Institutions
Sri Srinivasa degree college
It also has some notable intermediate colleges like
Krishna Reddy Siddhartha Junior College
Venkata Reddy Siddhartha Junior College
Government Girls College

The government of Andhra Pradesh is  planning to establish Government Medical College near Madanapalle and land acquisition has started.

Entertainment
There were many cinema theatres. At this moment, theatres Sai Chitra, Ravi, Sunil, A.S.R, Sree Krishna, Sidhartha, Mini Sidhartha only operating. 
Madhusudhana, Pancharatna, Avanthi, Usha, Jyothi, Mallikarjuna, Mini Mallikarjuna, Sesh Mahal, Bhavani, M.S.R.(Tarakarama) theatres closed or converted for other business purpose now.

MLAs of Madanapalle from 1952 

Madanapalle is an assembly constituency in Andhra Pradesh. M.L.A's of MADANAPALLE from 1952 to till now

 1952 – Dodda Seetharamaiah (Communist Party of India (CPI))
 1955 – T.G.K. Gupta (Indian National Congress)
 1962 – Dodda Seetharamaiah (CPI)
 1967 – A. Narasingarao (Indian National Congress)
 1972 – A. Narasingarao (Indian National Congress)
 1978 – G.V. Narayana Reddy (Indian National Congress I)
 1983 – R. Narayana Reddy (Telugu Desam Party)
 1985 – R. Narayana Reddy (Telugu Desam Party)
 1989 – A. Mohan Reddy (Indian National Congress)
 1994 – R. Sagar Reddy (Telugu Desam Party)
 1999 – R. Shobha rani (Telugu Desam Party)
 2004 – Dommalapati Ramesh (Telugu Desam Party)
 2009 – Mohammed Shahjahan Basha(Jaha) (Indian National Congress)
 2014 – Thippa Reddy (YSRCP)
 2019– Nawaj Bhasha( YSRCP)

Notable people 

 Jiddu Krishnamurti, a philosopher is one of the notable personalities from the town.
 Rama Prabha, actress 
 Bindu Madhavi, Tamil Film Actress
 Sri M, yogi and spiritual teacher

See also 
 List of cities in Andhra Pradesh by population
 List of municipalities in Andhra Pradesh

References

Cities in Andhra Pradesh